The 1946 Pennsylvania State Teachers College Conference football season was the season of college football played by the 11 member schools of the Pennsylvania State Teachers College Conference (PSTCC) as part of the 1946 college football season.

The California Vulcans won the PSTCC championship with a perfect 9–0 record and outscored opponents by a total of 284 to 34.

Conference overview

Teams

California

The 1946 California Vulcans football team represented California  State Teachers College (now known as California University of Pennsylvania) of California, Pennsylvania. In their first year under head coach Earl Bruce, the  team compiled a perfect 9–0 record, won the PSTCC championship, and outscored opponents by a total of 284 to 34. It was California's first season of football after a four-year hiatus due to World War II.

California had the highest scoring college football team in Pennsylvania.

Mansfield State

The 1946 Mansfield State Mountaineers football team represented Mansfield State Teachers College (now known as Mansfield University of Pennsylvania) of Mansfield, Pennsylvania. Led by head coach Edward D. Casey, the Mountaineers compiled a 7–0–1 record (4–0–1 against PSTCC opponents), finished in second place in the PSTCC, and outscored opponents by a total of 155 to 52.

Millersville State

The 1946 Millersville State Marauders football team represented Millersville State Teachers College (now known as Millersville University of Pennsylvania) of Millersville, Pennsylvania. Led by head coach John A. Fischer, the Marauders compiled a 3–3 record (3–1 against PSTCC opponents), finished in third place in the PSTCC, and outscored opponents by a total of 60 to 57.

Slippery Rock State

The 1946 Slippery Rock State football team represented Slippery Rock State Teachers College (now known as Slippery Rock University of Pennsylvania) of Slippery Rock, Pennsylvania. The team compiled a 3–4–1 record (2–1 against PSTCC opponents), finished in fourth place in the PSTCC, and outscored opponents by a total of 57 to 41. Kerr Thompson began the season as head coach, announced  his retirement during the season, and was replaced by William "Pop" Storer.

Indiana State

The 1946 Indiana State Indians football team represented Indiana State Teachers College (now known as Indiana University of Pennsylvania) of Indiana, Pennsylvania. Led by head coach George P. Miller, Indiana State compiled a 5–3 record (3–3 against PSTCC opponents), finished in fifth place in the PSTCC, and outscored opponents by a total of 150 to 85.

Clarion State

The 1946 Clarion State Golden Eagles football team represented Clarion State Teachers College (now known as Clarion University of Pennsylvania) of Clarion, Pennsylvania. In their 12th year under head coach Waldo S. Tippin, the Golden Eagles compiled a 3–4 record (2–2 against PSTCC opponents), finished in sixth place in the PSTCC, and outscored opponents by a total of 123 to 86.

East Stroudsburg State

The 1946 East Stroudsburg State Warriors football team represented East Stroudsburg State Teachers College (now known as East Stroudsburg University of Pennsylvania) of East Stroudsburg, Pennsylvania. Led by head coach Eugene H. Martin, the Warriors compiled a 5–2 record (1–1 against PSTCC opponents), finished in seventh place in the PSTCC, and outscored opponents by a total of 176 to 33.

Bloomsburg State

The 1946 Bloomsburg State Huskies football team represented Bloomsburg State Teachers College (now known as Bloomsburg University of Pennsylvania) of Bloomsburg, Pennsylvania. Led by head coach John A. Hoch, the Huskies compiled a 4–3–1 record (2–3–1 against PSTCC opponents), finished in eighth place in the PSTCC, and outscored opponents by a total of 91 to 57.

Lock Haven State

The 1946 Lock Haven State Bald Eagles football team represented Lock Haven State Teachers College (now known as Lock Haven University of Pennsylvania) of Lock Haven, Pennsylvania. Led by head coach Hubert Jack, the Bald Eagles compiled a 4–5–1 record (1–4–1 against PSTCC opponents), finished in ninth place in the PSTCC, and were outscored by a total of 165 to 132.

Shippensburg State

The 1946 Shippensburg State Raiders football team represented Shippensburg State Teachers College (now known as Shippensburg University of Pennsylvania) of Shippensburg, Pennsylvania. In their eleventh season under head coach Eddie Gulian, the Raiders compiled a 2–5–1 record (1–5–1 against PSTCC opponents), finished in tenth place in the PSTCC, and were outscored by a total of 155 to 73.

Edinboro State

The 1946 Edinboro State Fighting Scots football team represented Edinboro State Teachers College (now known as Edinboro University of Pennsylvania) of Edinboro, Pennsylvania. Led by head coach Arthur L. McComb, the Fighting Scots compiled a 0–6 record (0–3 against PSTCC opponents), finished in last place in the PSTCC, scored only once in the entire season, and were outscored by a total of 161 to 7.

References